Ralph Burkinshaw (26 March 1898 – June 1951) was an English professional footballer who played for a number of clubs.

Career
Burkinshaw had guested for a number of South Yorkshire clubs during First World War football, before starting his full career at South Shields in 1919. He played just two games at South Shields during the club's first season in Division Two before having brief spells at Northampton Town and Gainsborough Trinity. In November 1920 he signed for Bury where he spent nearly five years, including 13 games in Division One during his 1924–25 benefit season.

In July 1925 he signed for Bradford City as an inside forward although he spent much of his Bradford career as a right half. He also spent five seasons at Bradford, including being top scorer with 12 league goals and two FA Cup goals in the 1927–28 season and being an ever-present in the club's 1928–29 title-winning season in Division Three (North). He signed for Wrexham in July 1930, winning a Welsh Cup in his first season and later served as assistant manager. He left Wrexham to finish his career in non-league, with first Scarborough, then Mexborough Athletic and finally Denaby United.

He was also a useful batsman in Yorkshire league cricket.

Burkinshaw died in June 1951.

Honours
Bradford City
Football League Third Division North: 1928–29

Wrexham
Welsh Cup: 1931

References

1898 births
1951 deaths
People from Kilnhurst
English footballers
Association football inside forwards
Association football wing halves
South Shields F.C. (1889) players
Gainsborough Trinity F.C. players
Northampton Town F.C. players
Bury F.C. players
Bradford City A.F.C. players
Wrexham A.F.C. players
Scarborough F.C. players
Mexborough Athletic F.C. players
Denaby United F.C. players
English Football League players
Sheffield United F.C. wartime guest players